The 1984 Summer Olympics (officially the Games of the XXIII Olympiad and also known as Los Angeles 1984) were an international multi-sport event held from July 28 to August 12, 1984, in Los Angeles, California, United States. It marked the second time that Los Angeles had hosted the Games, the first being in 1932. California was the home state of the incumbent U.S. President Ronald Reagan, who officially opened the Games. These were the first Summer Olympic Games under the IOC presidency of Juan Antonio Samaranch.

The 1984 Games were boycotted by a total of fourteen Eastern Bloc countries, including the Soviet Union and East Germany, in response to the American-led boycott of the 1980 Summer Olympics in Moscow in protest of the Soviet invasion of Afghanistan; Romania and Yugoslavia were the only Socialist European states that opted to attend the Games. Albania, Iran and Libya also chose to boycott the Games for unrelated reasons. 

Despite the field being depleted in certain sports due to the boycott, 140 National Olympic Committees took part in the 1984 Games, a record number at the time. The United States won the most gold and overall medals, followed by Romania and West Germany.

The 1984 Summer Olympics are widely considered to be the most financially successful modern Olympics, serving as an example on how to run an Olympic games.

On July 18, 2009, a 25th anniversary celebration of the 1984 Games was held at the Los Angeles Memorial Coliseum. The celebration included a speech by former Los Angeles Olympic Organizing Committee president Peter Ueberroth, as well as a re-enactment of the lighting of the Olympic cauldron. 

Los Angeles will host the Summer Olympics for the third time in 2028.

Host selection
After the terrorist attack at the 1972 Summer Olympics, the significant financial debts of Montreal (1976), and various boycotts by National Olympic Committees, few cities by the late 1970s were willing to bid for the Summer Olympics. Only two cities (Tehran and Los Angeles) made serious bids for the 1984 Summer Games, but before the final selection of a "winning" city in 1978, the bid from Tehran was withdrawn as a result of Iran's policy changes following the Iranian Revolution and a change in the country's ruling system. Hence, the selection process for the 1984 Summer Olympics consisted of a single finalized bid from Los Angeles, which the International Olympic Committee (IOC) accepted.  The selection was officially made at the 80th IOC Session in Athens on May 18, 1978.

Los Angeles had unsuccessfully bid for the two previous Summer Olympic Games (1976 and 1980, which went to Montreal and Moscow, respectively). The United States Olympic Committee (USOC) had submitted at least one bid for every Olympics since 1944 but had not succeeded since the Los Angeles Olympics in 1932, the previous time only a single bid had been issued for the Summer Olympics.

Torch relay

The 1984 Olympic Torch Relay began in New York City and ended in Los Angeles, traversing 33 states and the District of Columbia. Unlike later torch relays, the torch was continuously carried by runners on foot. The route covered more than 9,320 mi (15,000 km) and involved 3,636 runners. Noted athlete O. J. Simpson was among the runners, carrying the torch up the California Incline in Santa Monica. Gina Hemphill, a granddaughter of Jesse Owens, carried the torch into the Coliseum, completed a lap around the track, then handed it off to the final runner, Rafer Johnson, winner of the decathlon at the 1960 Summer Olympics. With the torch, he touched off the flame which passed through a specially designed flammable Olympic logo, igniting all five rings. Johnson became the first person of African descent to light the cauldron in Olympic history. The flame then passed up to the cauldron atop the peristyle and remained aflame for the duration of the Games.

Music

John Williams composed the theme for the Olympiad, "Los Angeles Olympic Theme" later also known as "Olympic Fanfare and Theme". This piece won a Grammy for Williams and became one of the most well-known musical themes of the Olympic Games, along with Leo Arnaud's "Bugler's Dream"; the latter is sometimes attached to the beginning of Olympic Fanfare and Theme. Composer Bill Conti also wrote a song to inspire the weightlifters called "Power". An album, The Official Music of the XXIII Olympiad—Los Angeles 1984, featured those three tracks along with sports themes written for the occasion by popular musical artists including Foreigner, Toto, Loverboy, Herbie Hancock, Quincy Jones, Christopher Cross, Philip Glass, Paul Engemann and Giorgio Moroder. "Reach Out" was the main soundtrack and is the official theme song of the 1984 Summer Olympics.

The Brazilian composer Sérgio Mendes also produced a special song for the 1984 Olympic Games, "Olympia," from his 1984 album Confetti. A choir of approximately one thousand voices was assembled of singers in the region. All were volunteers from nearby churches, schools and universities.

Etta James performed "When the Saints Go Marching In" at the Opening Ceremony.

Vicki McClure, along with the International Children's Choir of Long Beach, sang "Reach Out and Touch".

Lionel Richie performed a special extendend 9-minute version of his hit single "All Night Long" at the closing ceremonies.

Highlights

Arts Festival
The 1984 Summer Olympics was preceded by the 10-week-long adjunct Los Angeles Olympic Arts Festival, which opened on June 2 and ended on August 12. It provided more than 400 performances by 146 theater, dance and music companies, representing every continent and 18 countries. It was organized by then-CalArts President Robert Fitzpatrick.

General
 The opening ceremony featured the arrival of Bill Suitor by means of the Bell Aerosystems rocket pack (also known as a Jet Pack).
 The United States Army Band formed the Olympic rings to start the opening ceremony.
 The United States topped the medal count for the first time since 1968, winning a record 83 gold medals and surpassing the Soviet Union's total of 80 golds at the 1980 Summer Olympics.
 As a result of an IOC agreement designating the Republic of China (Taiwan) as Chinese Taipei, the People's Republic of China returned to the Summer Olympics for the first time since Helsinki 1952. The Military anthem of China was played for both teams during the opening ceremony.
 Local Los Angeles artist Rodolfo Escalera was commissioned to create nine paintings depicting the Summer Games that would later be turned into collectible plates and presented as "The Official Gift of the 1984 Olympics".
The Los Angeles Olympic Organizing Committee named Ernie Barnes "Sports Artist of the 1984 Olympic Games". LAOOC President Peter V. Ueberroth said Barnes and his art "captured the essence of the Olympics" and "portray the city's ethnic diversity, the power and emotion of sports competition, the singleness of purpose and hopes that go into the making of athletes the world over." Barnes was commissioned to create five Olympic-themed paintings and serve as an official Olympic spokesman to encourage inner-city youth.

Track and field
 Carl Lewis of the United States, making his first of four appearances at the Olympics, equaled the 1936 performance of Jesse Owens by winning four gold medals, in the 100 m, 200 m, 4 × 100 m relay and long jump.
 Edwin Moses of the United States won the gold medal in the 400m hurdles 8 years after winning in 1976.
 Joaquim Cruz of Brazil won the 800 meter run with a time of 1:43.00 to set an Olympic record.
 Nawal El Moutawakel of Morocco became the first female Olympic champion of a Muslim nation—and the first of her country—in the 400 m hurdles.
 Carlos Lopes, from Portugal, won the Marathon at the age of 37, with a time of 2:09:21, an Olympic record that stood for 24 years. It was the first gold medal ever for Portugal. Gold medal favorite, World Record holder and the then World Champion, Robert de Castella from Australia, finished in 5th place, 1:48 behind Lopes.
 A marathon for women was held for the first time at the Olympics (won by Joan Benoit of the U.S.). The event was also remembered for Swiss runner Gabriela Andersen-Schiess, who – suffering from heat exhaustion – entered the stadium for the final lap in a state of almost total exhaustion, barely able to walk but eventually completing the race, collapsing at the finishing line and being immediately treated by medical personnel.
 Daley Thompson of Great Britain apparently missed a new world record in winning his second consecutive gold medal in the decathlon; the next year, his score was retroactively raised to 8847, giving him the record.
 Sebastian Coe of Great Britain became the first man to win consecutive gold medals in the 1500m.
 Maricica Puică of Romania won the 3000 meters, known for the Mary Decker vs. Zola Budd rivalry. World champion and heavy favorite Decker fell after a controversial collision with Budd. However, Puică had the best annual time at the distance, easily run away from Silver medalist Wendy Sly of Great Britain and appeared to have more to give if it had been necessary. Puică was injured during the very first Track and Field World Championships in Helsinki the year before, in which Decker had won both the 1500 meters and the 3000 meters.

Other sports
 The first gold medal to be awarded at the Los Angeles Olympics was also the first-ever medal to be won by an athlete from China when Xu Haifeng won the 50 m Pistol event.
 Archer Neroli Fairhall from New Zealand was the first paraplegic Olympian at any Olympic Games, coming 35th in the Women's individual event.
 Synchronized swimming and rhythmic gymnastics debuted in Los Angeles as Olympic events, as did wind surfing.
 Li Ning from the People's Republic of China won 6 medals in gymnastics, 3 gold, 2 silver, and 1 bronze, earning him the nickname "Prince of Gymnasts" in China. Li would later light the Olympic Cauldron at the 2008 Olympics.
 Steve Redgrave of Great Britain won his first title in rowing of the record five he would go on to win in five Olympic competitions.
 Victor Davis of Canada set a new world record in winning the gold medal in the 200-meter breaststroke in swimming.
 Mary Lou Retton of the United States became the first gymnast outside Eastern Europe to win the gymnastics all-around competition.
 In men's gymnastics, the American team won the Gold Medal.
 France won the Olympic association football (soccer) tournament, defeating Brazil 2–0 in the final. Olympic football was unexpectedly played before massive crowds throughout America, with several sell-outs at the 100,000+ seat Rose Bowl. This interest eventually led to the U.S. hosting the 1994 FIFA World Cup.
 The Soviet-led boycott affected weightlifting more than any other sport: 94 of the world's top 100 ranked lifters were absent, as were 29 of the 30 medalists from the recent world championships. All 10 of the defending world champions in the 10 weight categories were absent. The success of the Eastern Bloc countries might be explained by state-run doping programs that had been developed there.
 Future Dream Team members Michael Jordan, Patrick Ewing, and Chris Mullin were on the team that won the gold medal in basketball. The 1984 U.S. men's Olympic basketball team was coached by Indiana Hoosiers head coach Bobby Knight.
 Connie Carpenter-Phinney of the United States became the first woman to win an Olympic cycling event when she won the women's individual road race.

Venues

Venues in the city of Los Angeles 
 Los Angeles Memorial Coliseum – opening/closing ceremonies, athletics
 Los Angeles Memorial Sports Arena – boxing
 Dodger Stadium – baseball
 Pauley Pavilion, University of California, Los Angeles – gymnastics
 Eagle's Nest Arena, California State University, Los Angeles – judo
 Olympic Swim Stadium, University of Southern California – swimming, diving, synchronized swimming
 Olympic Village (athlete housing), University of Southern California
 Los Angeles Tennis Center, University of California, Los Angeles – tennis
 Athletes Village, University of California, Los Angeles
 Albert Gersten Pavilion, Loyola Marymount University, Westchester, California – weightlifting
 Streets of Los Angeles – athletics (marathon)

Venues in Southern California
 El Dorado Park, Long Beach, California – archery
 The Forum, Inglewood, California – basketball and team handball finals
 Lake Casitas, Ventura County, California – canoeing, rowing
 Olympic Velodrome, California State University, Dominguez Hills, Carson, California – cycling (track)
 Mission Viejo, Orange County, California – cycling (individual road race)
 Santa Anita Park, Arcadia, California – equestrian
 Fairbanks Ranch Country Club, Rancho Santa Fe, California, California – equestrian sports (eventing endurance)
 Long Beach Convention Center, Long Beach, California – fencing
 Rose Bowl, Pasadena, California – football (final)
 Titan Gymnasium, California State University, Fullerton, Fullerton, California – handball
 Weingart Stadium, East Los Angeles College, Monterey Park, California – field hockey
 Coto de Caza, Orange County, California – modern pentathlon (fencing, riding, running, shooting)
 Olympic Shooting Range, Prado Recreational Area, Chino, California – shooting
 Long Beach Arena, Long Beach, California – volleyball
 Raleigh Runnels Memorial Pool, Pepperdine University, Malibu, California – water polo
 Anaheim Convention Center, Anaheim, California – wrestling
 Long Beach Shoreline Marina, Long Beach, California – sailing
 Artesia Freeway – cycling (road team time trial)
 Heritage Park Aquatic Center, Irvine, California – modern pentathlon (swimming)
 Santa Monica College, Santa Monica, California – athletics (marathon start)
 Santa Monica, California – athletics (marathon)

Other venues
 Harvard Stadium, Harvard University, Boston, Massachusetts – football preliminaries
 Navy–Marine Corps Memorial Stadium, United States Naval Academy, Annapolis, Maryland – football preliminaries
 Stanford Stadium, Stanford University, Stanford, California – football preliminaries

Medals awarded
The 1984 Summer Olympic program featured 221 events in the following 21 sports:

 Aquatics
 
 
 
 
 
 
 
 
 
 
 Road (3)
 Track (5)
 
 Dressage (2)
 Eventing (2)
 Show jumping (2)
 
 
 
 
 Artistic (14)
 Rhythmic (1)
 
 
 
 
 
 
 
 
 
 Freestyle (10)
 Greco-Roman (10)

Demonstration sports
 Baseball
 Tennis

Calendar
All times are in Pacific Daylight Time (UTC-7); the other two cities, Boston and Annapolis use Eastern Daylight Time (UTC-4)

Medal count

These are the top ten nations that won medals at the 1984 Games.

Participating National Olympic Committees

Athletes from 140 states competed at the 1984 Summer Olympics. Eighteen states made their Olympic debut: Bahrain, Bangladesh, Bhutan, British Virgin Islands, Djibouti, Equatorial Guinea, The Gambia, Grenada, Mauritania, Mauritius, North Yemen, Oman, Qatar, Rwanda, Western Samoa, Solomon Islands, Tonga, and the United Arab Emirates. Zaire had previously competed at the 1968 Summer Olympics as Congo-Kinshasa. The People's Republic of China made its first appearance in a Summer Olympics since 1952, while for the first time the Republic of China team participated under the politically contrived name of Chinese Taipei.

The Soviet Union led the Warsaw Pact members and other Communist countries in a boycott of the Los Angeles Olympics, in retaliation for the U.S.-led boycott of the Moscow Olympics four years earlier (over the Soviet Union's invasion of Afghanistan in 1979). The pretexts for the 1984 Soviet-led boycott were concerns over security, "chauvinistic sentiments" and "an anti-Soviet hysteria ... being whipped up" in the United States. However, a handful of communist countries disregarded the boycott and attended the Games anyway, among them Yugoslavia (host of the 1984 Winter Olympics), the People's Republic of China, and Romania (the only Warsaw Pact country that had opted to ignore the Soviet demands). The Romanian team received a particularly warm reception from the United States; when the Romanian athletes entered during the opening ceremonies, they were greeted by a standing ovation from the spectators, who were mostly U.S. citizens. This would turn out to be Romania's most successful Olympic Games – they won 53 medals, including 20 golds.

In the table below, the number of athletes representing each state is shown in parentheses.

Boycotting countries

Fifteen countries took part in the Soviet-led boycott of the 1984 Summer Olympics:
  Afghanistan
  Angola
  Bulgaria
  Cuba
  Czechoslovakia
  East Germany
  Ethiopia
  Hungary
  Laos
  Mongolia
  North Korea
  Poland
  Soviet Union
  South Yemen
  Vietnam

Albania, Iran and Libya also boycotted the Los Angeles Olympics, citing political reasons, but these countries were not a part of the Soviet-led boycott. Albania and Iran were the only two countries to boycott both the 1980 and 1984 Summer Games.
  Albania
  Iran
  Libya

Soviet doping plan
Documents obtained in 2016 revealed the Soviet Union's plans for a statewide doping system in track and field in preparation for the 1984 Summer Olympics in Los Angeles. Dated prior to the country's decision to boycott the Games, the document detailed the existing steroids operations of the program, along with suggestions for further enhancements. The communication, directed to the Soviet Union's head of track and field, was prepared by Dr. Sergei Portugalov of the Institute for Physical Culture. Portugalov was also one of the main figures involved in the implementation of the Russian doping program prior to the 2016 Summer Olympics. Filmmaker and director of 2017 movie Icarus Bryan Fogel has said that stricter doping controls might have been the main reason for the Soviet boycott.

Financial success of Los Angeles as host city

Following the news of the massive financial losses of the 1976 Summer Olympics in Montreal, the only two cities to express a genuine interest in hosting the 1984 Games were Los Angeles and New York. Given that only one city per country is allowed to bid for any one Games, the USOC vote for the American bid city was effectively the deciding vote for the 1984 Olympics host city. In this case, the Los Angeles bid received 55 votes compared with New York's 39 votes – this is the closest that the city of New York has ever come to being selected to host the Olympic Games, coming closer in 1984 than they did in their 2012 bid (when they lost to London).

The low level of interest among potential host cities for the 1984 Games had been viewed as a major threat to the future of the Olympic Games. However, after the financial success of the Los Angeles Games, cities began to show a renewed interest in bidding to become host again. The Los Angeles and Montreal Games are seen as examples of best and worst practice when organizing the Olympics and serve as valuable lessons to prospective host cities.

Ambitious construction projects for the two previous Summer Olympics, Montreal 1976 and Moscow 1980, had burdened organizers with substantial debts as expenses greatly exceeded revenues. Furthermore, the 1976 and 1980 Olympics were entirely government-funded. Unlike Montreal and Moscow, Los Angeles 1984 was privately funded, with strict controls imposed on expenditure; rather than constructing new venues with overly ambitious designs, the organizers chose instead to utilise existing venues and facilities wherever possible. The main example of this was the Los Angeles Memorial Coliseum, which was also the Olympic Stadium for the 1932 Summer Olympics. The only two new venues constructed specifically for the 1984 Summer Olympics were secured with the backing of corporate sponsors: the Olympic Velodrome was largely funded by the 7-Eleven corporation and the Olympic Swim Stadium by McDonald's.

In addition to corporate support, the Olympic committee also used the income from the exclusive television rights, and for the first time these contracts would prove to be a significant source of revenue. Adjusted for inflation, the Los Angeles Games secured twice the amount of income received by the 1980 Moscow Summer Olympics and four times that of the 1976 Montreal Summer Olympics.

Following the success of the 1984 Games, the Los Angeles OCOG, led by Peter Ueberroth, used the profits to create the LA84 Foundation for promoting youth sports in Southern California, educating coaches and maintaining a sports library.

In popular culture

The games were the subject of the 1983–84 United States commemorative coin series.

McDonald's ran a promotion titled, "When the U.S. Wins, You Win" where customers scratched off a ticket with the name of an Olympic event on it. If the U.S. won a medal in that event, then they would be given a free menu item: a Big Mac for a gold medal, an order of french fries for a silver medal, and a Coca-Cola for a bronze medal. The promotion became more popular than expected due to the Soviet boycott which led to the U.S. winning far more Olympic medals than expected. This promotion was parodied in The Simpsons episode "Lisa's First Word", where Krusty Burger runs a similar offer. The promotion was intended to be rigged so that prizes would only be offered in events dominated by the Eastern Bloc, but the Soviet-led boycott causes Krusty to personally lose $44 million. He vehemently promises "to spit in every fiftieth burger," to which Homer retorts "I like those odds!" Chief Wiggum also exclaims that he could kiss Carl Lewis, who won four gold medals at the Games.

On NCIS, Tim McGee has an obsession with jet packs, stemming from having attended the 1984 Olympic ceremony as a child and having Bill Suitor fly over his head in his jet pack. This storyline is based on the real experience of executive producer and writer Jesse Stern.

Pop-punk band Bowling for Soup references the games in the song "I Can't Stand LA". During a section showing appreciation for the city, the song states, "thank you for hair metal and the '84 Olympics."

Jilly Cooper's novel Riders has a storyline set at the show jumping event at the 1984 Summer Olympics.

In the Seinfeld episode "The Gymnast", Jerry dates a woman who competed in the 1984 Olympics and won a silver medal for Romania.

In the same week that the Games began, British pop star Howard Jones released a single called Like to Get to Know You Well which eventually made number 4 on the UK Singles Chart and number 49 on the Billboard Hot 100 in the United States. On the sleeve, the record was "dedicated to the original spirit of the Olympic Games".

See also

 Use of performance-enhancing drugs in the Olympic Games — 1984 Los Angeles

References

External links

 
 Olympic Review 1984 – Official results 
 Official Report Vol. 1
 Official Report Vol. 2

Further reading
 Dyreson, Mark. "Global television and the transformation of the Olympics: The 1984 Los Angeles Games." International Journal of the History of Sport 32.1 (2015): 172-184.
 Edelman, Robert Simon. "The Russians are not coming! The Soviet withdrawal from the games of the XXIII Olympiad." International Journal of the History of Sport 32.1 (2015): 9-36. 
 
 Llewellyn, Matthew, John Gleaves, and Wayne Wilson. "The Historical Legacy of the 1984 Los Angeles Olympic Games." International Journal of the History of Sport 32#1   (2015) : 1-8.
 Llewellyn, Matthew, John Gleaves, and Wayne Wilson, eds. The 1984 Los Angeles Olympic Games: Assessing the 30-Year Legacy (Routledge, 2017).
 

 
Olympic Games in California
Summer Olympics in Los Angeles
Summer Olympics by year
Olympics
Olympics
Olympics, Summer
Olympics
July 1984 sports events in the United States
August 1984 sports events in the United States
Olym